A dishdrawer is a type of dishwashing machine invented, designed and manufactured by Fisher & Paykel. They are available under several brands depending on geographic location Fisher & Paykel, Kenmore Appliances, KitchenAid, and Bauknecht following a distribution agreement with Whirlpool.

In 1987 Fisher & Paykel staff engineer Adrian Sargeant and designer Phil Brace developed the DishDrawer concept. A DishDrawer is based on a design similar to filing cabinet with each dishwasher having two fully independent cabinets (or drawers). The DishDrawer was exhibited in 1996 at Domotechnica and was launched in 1997. By this time Fisher & Paykel had spent $10 million on the machine's development.

They are marketed as either an individual drawer, for small apartments or homes or double units which have two separate drawers stacked together. Each drawer is independent, allowing different wash settings to be used on different loads. It also allows dishes to be washed in one drawer as the other is filled. And is potentially more energy efficient. 

DishDrawer washers have capacity restrictions due to their lower height, limiting the size of dishes that can be placed inside. In response to this, Fisher & Paykel have added 'Tall' models to their DishDrawer line up.
Early models were subject to complaints about the noise that they made when washing. This has been improved on with later models.

The concept behind the dishdrawer is "to use compact technologies to provide a very space efficient dishwasher." Fisher and Paykel have made several dish drawer configurations with single and double varieties available.  This means you can install two single dishdrawers side by side toward the top of the bench for easy access or you can install a double dishdrawer where the two drawers are stacked.  DishDrawers provide plenty of flexibility"

References

Home appliances
New Zealand design